Thiophosphoryl fluoride is an inorganic molecular gas with formula PSF3 containing phosphorus, sulfur and fluorine. It spontaneously ignites in air and burns with a cool flame. The discoverers were able to have flames around their hands without discomfort, and called it "probably one of the coldest flames known". The gas was discovered in 1888.

It is useless for chemical warfare as it burns immediately and is not toxic enough.

Preparation
Thiophosphoryl fluoride was discovered and named by J. W. Rodger and T. E. Thorpe in 1888.

They prepared it by heating arsenic trifluoride and thiophosphoryl chloride together in a sealed glass tube to 150 °C. Also produced in this reaction was silicon tetrafluoride and phosphorus fluorides. By increasing the PSCl3 the proportion of PSF3 was increased. They observed the spontaneous inflammability. They also used this method:

3 PbF2 + P2S5 → 3 PbS + PSF3

at 170 °C, and also substituting a mixture of red phosphorus and sulfur, and substituting bismuth trifluoride.

Another way to prepare PSF3 is to add fluoride to PSCl3 using sodium fluoride in acetonitrile.

A high yield reaction can be used to produce the gas:

P4S10 + 12 HF → 6 H2S + 4 PSF3

Under high pressure phosphorus trifluoride can react with hydrogen sulfide to yield:

PF3 + H2S → PSF3 + H2 (1350 bar at 200 °C)

Another high pressure production uses phosphorus trifluoride with sulfur.

Reactions
PSF3 is decomposed by moisture and oxygen or heat. With heat, phosphorus, sulfur and phosphorus fluorides are formed:

PSF3 → PF3 + S

The hot gas reacts with glass producing SF4, sulfur and elemental phosphorus. The pure gas is completely absorbed by alkali solutions. However, it does not react with ether, benzene, carbon disulfide, or pure sulfuric acid. It is stable against CaO, which can be used to remove impurities such as SiF4 and PF3. In air it burns spontaneously with a greyish green flame, producing solid white fumes. With dry oxygen combustion may not be spontaneous and the flame is yellow. On burning SO2 and P2O5 are produced. The gas burns with one of the coldest flames known.

Reaction with water is slow:

PSF3 + 4 H2O → H2S + H3PO4 + 3 HF

If PSF3 is allowed to react with water in a lead glass container, the hydrofluoric acid and hydrogen sulfide combination produces a black deposit of lead sulfide on the inner surface of the glass.

It reacts with four times its volume of ammonia gas producing ammonium fluoride and a mystery product, possibly P(NH2)2SF.

PSF3 is an initiator for the polymerization of tetrahydrofuran.

Sulfur removal
2 PSF3 + SO2 → 2 POF3 + 3 S

This reaction indicates why PSF3 is not formed from PF3 and SO2.

PSF3 + SO3 → POF3 + S2 and sulfur and sulfur sesquioxide (S42+ polysulfate) as additional products.

Fluorine substitution
PSF3 + 2 ICl → PCl2F3.

PSF3 combines with dimethylamine in solution to produce dimethylaminothiophosphoryldifluoride (CH3)2NPSF2 and difluorophosphate and hexafluorophosphate ions.

Thiophosphoryl difluoride isocyanate can be formed by reacting PSF3 with silicontetraisocyanate at 200 °C in an autoclave.

Cations
PSF3 reacts with alkali solutions producing the fluoride and a thiophosphate (PSO33−).

CsF + 2 PSF3 → CsPF6 + CsF2PS2 (a thiophosphate). Showing the gas is related to the fluorothiophosphate cation :PF2S2−.

PSF4− formed by reaction with SF6−

Related compounds
One fluorine can be substituted by iodine to give iodothiophosphoryldifluoride PSIF2. PSIF2 can be converted to hydrothiophosphoryldifluoride PSHF2 by reducing it with hydrogen iodide. In F2PSSPF2 one sulfur forms a bridge between two phosphorus atoms.

Dimethylaminothiophosphoryldifluoride is a foul smelling liquid with a boiling point of 117 °C. It has a Trouton constant of 24.4, and a heat of evaporation of 9530 cal/mole. Alternately it can be produced by fluoronating dimethylaminothiophosphoryldichloride.

Physical properties
The thiophosphoryl trifluoride molecule shape has been determined using electron diffraction. The interatomic distances are PS 0.187±0.003 nm, PF 0.153±0.002 nm and bond angles ∠FPF=100.3±2 °C, Microwave rotational spectrum has line values 2657.63±0.04 for PS32F3, 2614.73±0.04 for PS33F3, 2579.77±0.04 for PS34F3 MC/sec.

The critical point is at 346 K at 3.82 MPa. The liquid refractive index is 1.353 

The enthalpy of vapourisation 19.6 kJ/mol at boiling point. Enthalpy of vapourisation at other temperatures H=28.85011(346-T)0.38 kJ/mol

The molecule is polar. It has a non-uniform distribution of positive and negative charge which gives it a dipole moment. When an electric field is applied more energy is stored than if the molecules did not respond by rotating. This increases the dielectric constant. The dipole moment of one molecule of thiophosphoryl trifluoride is 0.640 Debye

Surface tension of the liquid is 26.3 dyne/cm.

The infrared spectrum includes vibrations at 275, 404, 442, 698, 951 and 983 cm−1. These can be used to identify the molecule.

References

Other references

Phosphorus halides
Thiophosphoryl compounds